Johann Caspar Füssli (3 January 1706 – 6 May 1782) was a Swiss portrait painter and writer.

Biography 
Füssli was born in Zurich to Hans Rudolf Füssli, who was also a painter, and Elisabeth Schärer. He studied painting in Vienna between 1724 and 1731, and then became a portraitist in the courts of southern Germany.
In 1736, he returned to Zurich, where he painted the members of the Government and figures of the Enlightenment era such as Johann Jakob Bodmer and Friedrich Gottlieb Klopstock.

He married Elisabeth Waser, and they had five children: Hans Rudolf, Johann Kaspar (1743–1786), Johann Heinrich ("Henry Fuseli", 1745–1832), Anna (1749–1772), and Elisabeth. Füssli died in Zurich in 1782.

Publications 
 Geschichte und Abbildung der besten Mahler in der Schweitz, (1754–1757), (Story And Illustration Of The Best Swiss Painters)
 Geschichte der besten Künstler in der Schweitz (1769–1779), (Story Of The Best Swiss Artists)

External links
 

 

Swiss portrait painters
Swiss art historians
1706 births
1782 deaths
Artists from Zürich
18th-century Swiss painters
18th-century Swiss male artists
Swiss male painters
Johann Caspar